Dana Lyons is an American folk and alternative rock musician, who wrote and performed the 1996 comedic folk song  "Cows With Guns".

Life
He was born in Kingston, New York, grew up in Niskayuna, New York, and graduated from Swarthmore College in 1982.

His environmentalist song "Our State Is a Dumpsite", became the subject of a proposal in the Washington legislature during the 1980s to be made the official state song.  He went on to perform music for the environmental group Earth First! and to record an album of children's music, At Night They Howl at the Moon before releasing the song "Cows With Guns," on the album of the same title, in 1996.

Lyons is the author of the children's book The Tree (2002). Jane Goodall penned the foreword and David Danioth provided the illustrations. Lyons currently resides in Bellingham, Washington.

Career
Lyons has toured in 46 of the 50 American states, around the East Coast of Australia and across Ireland, England, New Zealand, Mexico, Kazakhstan and Siberia. Lyons has performed at Farm Aid and the Harley Davidson Festival in Sturgis, South Dakota.

Two of Lyons’s songs have been made into illustrated books: Cows With Guns, published by Penguin, and The Tree, published by Illumination Arts.

Discography
Animal (1988)
I'd Go Anywhere to Fight for Oil to Lubricate the Red, White and Blue (1991)
WTO Disco
Turn of the Wench (1992)
At Night They Howl at the Moon: Environmental Songs for Kids with John Seed (1993)
Cows with Guns (1997) – No. 32 Australia
Ride the Lawn (2004)
Circle the World, songs and stories with Jane Goodall (2004)
Three Legged Coyote (2009)
The Great Salish Sea (2014)

Bibliography
Cows with Guns illustrated by Jeff Sinclair, 1998 
The Tree illustrated by David Danioth, 2002

References

External links
 Official site
 Dana Lyons on Myspace

People from Bellingham, Washington
Swarthmore College alumni
Living people
Musicians from Kingston, New York
Year of birth missing (living people)